David Clark (born in Perth, Western Australia on 31 August 1978) is an Australian racing driver who competed in the Fujitsu V8 Supercar touring car racing series.

His main achievements came from his kart racing career as a 14-time State Karting Champion and four-time Australian Karting Champion. He was also ninth in the World Junior Karting Championship (1993) and twice contested the World Senior Karting Championship (1995, 1996).

He also drove in the open-wheeled Australian Formula Ford and British Formula Three. His V8 Supercar series debut was in a Ford Falcon in 2006.

2006 accident

Clark was involved in the fatal crash of V8 Supercar driver Mark Porter at Mount Panorama Circuit. In an effort to avoid the stalled Porter, he slid his car sideways whilst travelling at high speed. The front right hand side of his car hit the driver's side door of Porter's car, crushing the side of the car. The front right hand of Porter's car also hit the drivers door of Clark, critically injuring him. Marshals were quick to arrive at the scene where one, unable to open the driver's door on Porter's car, opened the rear door in an attempt to check his condition. Both drivers were unconscious at the time. The race was called to an immediate stop and all racing was suspended for two hours while police combed for clues as to what happened.

Porter died in late afternoon of Sunday 8 October 2006 as the feature race was concluding. Just two hours after the race, Porter's family issued a statement announcing his death.

Clark eventually recovered and returned to racing in 2007.

Career results

References 

1978 births
Supercars Championship drivers
British Formula Three Championship drivers
Formula Ford drivers
Living people
Racing drivers from Perth, Western Australia